was a town located in Ōita District, Ōita Prefecture, Japan.

As of 1 June 2005, the town had an estimated population of 9,586 and the density of 68.33 persons per km². The total area was 140.29 km².

On October 1, 2005, Shōnai, along with the towns of Hasama and Yufuin (all from Ōita District), was merged to create the city of Yufu.

External links
 Yufu official website 

Dissolved municipalities of Ōita Prefecture